Louis is a French surname. Notable people with the surname include:

Antoine Louis (1723–1792), French surgeon and physiologist 
Arthur Louis (1945–2014, born as Louis Arthur Bulgin), Jamaican-British musician
Errol Louis (born 1962), American journalist and television show host
Chris Louis (born 1969), English speedway rider 
Christos Louis (born 1948), Greek molecular geneticist
Gaspard Louis, Haitian dancer and choreographer
Godfrey Louis, solid-state physicist 
Jean Louis (1907–1997), French-born costume designer
Jefferson Louis (born 1979), English footballer 
Joe Louis (1914–1981), professional name of American boxer and heavyweight champion Joseph Louis Barrow
Julia Louis-Dreyfus (born 1961), American actress, comedian, and producer
Lance Louis (born 1985), American football player
Laura Glen Louis, American author & poet,
Laurent Louis (born 1980), Belgian politician
Léopold Louis-Dreyfus (1833–1915), French businessman, founder of the Louis Dreyfus Group, and patriarch of the Louis-Dreyfus family
Lil Louis, stage name of American house-music producer and DJ Louis Sims
Michèle Pierre-Louis (born 1947), Haitian politician 
Morris Louis (1912–1962), American painter
Murray Louis (born 1926), American modern dancer and choreographer
Olin Pierre Louis, Haitian priest
Pierre Charles Alexandre Louis (1787–1872), French physician
Séraphine Louis (1864–1942), French painter 
Spyridon Louis (1873–1940), Greek runner
Thomas Louis (1758–1807), British naval officer
Tim Louis (born 1958), Canadian lawyer and municipal politician 
Tim Louis, Canadian Member of Parliament 
Tristan Louis (born 1971), French-American author
Wm. Roger Louis (born 1936), American historian

See also
Pierre Louÿs (1870–1925), French writer
Lewis (surname)

Surnames of Haitian origin
French-language surnames